The 2020–21 Bryant Bulldogs men's basketball team represented Bryant University during the 2020–21 NCAA Division I men's basketball season. The Bulldogs are led by third-year head coach Jared Grasso, and play their home games at the Chace Athletic Center in Smithfield, Rhode Island as members of the Northeast Conference. They finished the season 15-7, 10-4 to finish in 2nd place. They defeated Sacred Heart in the semifinals of the NEC tournament before losing in the championship game to Mount St. Mary’s. They received an invitation to the CBI were they lost to Coastal Carolina in the quarterfinals.

Previous season 
The Bulldogs finished the 2019–20 season 15–17, 7–11 in NEC play to finish in a three-way tie for seventh place. They lost in the quarterfinals of the NEC tournament to Saint Francis (PA).

Roster

Schedule and results

|-
!colspan=9 style=| Non-conference regular season

   

   

|-
!colspan=9 style=| NEC tournament

|-
!colspan=9 style=| CBI
|-

Schedule source:

References

Bryant Bulldogs men's basketball seasons
Bryant
Bryant
Bryant
Bryant